Mercury-Redstone 1A (MR-1A) was launched on December 19, 1960 from LC-5 at Cape Canaveral, Florida. The mission objectives of this uncrewed suborbital flight were to qualify the spacecraft for space flight and qualify the system for an upcoming primate suborbital flight. The spacecraft tested its instrumentation, posigrade rockets, retrorockets and recovery system. The mission was completely successful. The launch vehicle reached a slightly higher velocity than expected - . The Mercury spacecraft was recovered from the Atlantic Ocean by recovery helicopters about 15 minutes after landing. Serial numbers: Mercury Spacecraft #2 was reflown on MR-1A, together with the escape tower from Capsule #8 and the antenna fairing from Capsule #10. Redstone MRLV-3 was used. The flight time was 15 minutes and 45 seconds.

Mercury-Redstone suborbital flight events

Current location
Mercury spacecraft #2, used in both the Mercury-Redstone 1 and Mercury-Redstone 1A missions, was displayed at the NASA Ames Exploration Center, Moffett Federal Airfield, near Mountain View, California until 2022 when it was relocated to the Cradle of Aviation Museum in Garden City, NY.

Notes

See also
Splashdown

References

This New Ocean: A History of Project Mercury - NASA SP-4201

External links

 "Space Progress: 'Man-In-Space' Capsule Recovery Successful", a December 22, 1960 Universal-International newsreel briefly covering the Mercury-Redstone 1A mission. Courtesy of the Internet Archive.
 Mercury spacecraft #2 display page on "A Field Guide to American Spacecraft" website.

1960 in spaceflight
Project Mercury
1960 in the United States
Suborbital spaceflight